Christopher H. Danou  is a former member of the Wisconsin State Assembly, who represented the 92nd Assembly District, first elected in 2008. He is a member of the Democratic Party. He lost his bid for reelection in 2016.

Born in Bloomington, Illinois, Danou graduated from Columbus High School in Marshfield, Wisconsin. He earned a BA in History from University of Wisconsin–Madison, an MA in International Relations, the American University, and an MS in Wildlife Biology from University of Wisconsin–Stevens Point. He was a Police Officer in Onalaska, Wisconsin, President of the Onalaska Professional Police Association and a member of the County Emergency Response Team (SWAT Unit) and the Metropolitan Enforcement Group. He lived in Trempealeau, Wisconsin.

References

External links
Chris Danou official campaign website
 
Follow the Money - Chris Danou
2008 2006 campaign contributions
Chris Danou campaign contributions at Wisconsin Democracy Campaign

Living people
People from Bloomington, Illinois
People from Trempealeau, Wisconsin
American University alumni
University of Wisconsin–Stevens Point alumni
American police officers
21st-century American politicians
People from Onalaska, Wisconsin
Democratic Party members of the Wisconsin State Assembly
Year of birth missing (living people)